MMHL can refer to:

Manitoba Midget 'AAA' Hockey League
Maritime Major Hockey League